Bullecourt is a commune in the Pas-de-Calais department in the Hauts-de-France region in France.

Geography
Bullecourt lies on the Upper Cretaceous plain of Artois between Arras and Bapaume and east of the A1 motorway. This satellite photograph shows Bullecourt just north of centre. Quéant is the larger of the two villages near the eastern edge. The A1 and the high-speed (TGV) railway line run up the western edge. To the south of Bullecourt, a now closed local railway line snakes from east to west.

Population

Transportation
Bullecourt lies in the triangle made by the A1, A2 and A26 motorways and that made by the N17, N30 and D939 roads.

History
There were remains from the Gallo-Roman period and the village was mentioned under the name "Bullecortis", in 1096.

In 620, it was the birthplace of Saint Vindicien, a follower of Saint Eligius, known in French as Saint Eloi. Vindicien became successively, bishop of Arras and bishop of Cambrai. He is regarded as the founder of the abbey named after his mentor, Mont St Eloi, of which Bullecourt became a lordship.

War has twice completely destroyed the village: in 1543 during the Ninth Italian War (1542–1546) and in 1917, during the First World War.

In early 1917, during the northern hemisphere spring, the First attack on Bullecourt (11 April 1917) and the Battle of Bullecourt (3–17 May 1917) became significant to the military history of Australia in particular. The village lay at the southern end of a highly active front – and formed part of the Hindenburg Line. In the First attack of Bullecourt, two brigades of the 4th Australian Division attacked German positions in Bullecourt, supported by 12 tanks but without artillery support. Caught in heavy fire, the Australians were forced to retreat. The 4th Australian Brigade alone sustained losses of 2,258 killed, wounded or taken prisoner, out of approximately 3,000 infantry. Only 750 Germans soldiers were killed, while they captured 27 Australian officers and 1,137 other ranks. In the Battle of Bullecourt, an attack on both flanks of the village was conducted by the 2nd Australian Division and the 62nd (2nd West Riding) Division. Bullecourt was recaptured but the anticipated breakthrough on the Hindenburg line did not occur. In total, there were 14,000 Australian and British casualties. The Musée Jean et Denise Letaille (established in 2012) commemorates this fighting.

Sights
While there were many bunkers and dugouts, from the period of the Hindenburg Line, there is also an underground shelter from the 17th century.

The church of St. Vlaast was rebuilt after 1918.

There is a museum of objects collected from the periods of the world wars.

Economy and village life
The economy is one of general farming with the raising of beef. The village has an agricultural co-operative.

The village festival is held on the first Sunday of June and there is a festival in honour of the Australians on the last Saturday in April.

See also
 Communes of the Pas-de-Calais department

References

External links

 Bullecourt: First World War
 An Australian view of the Bullecourt fighting
 memorials
 Interpretation of the Hindenburg Line photograph.
 

Communes of Pas-de-Calais